Mohammed may refer to:

Politicians
 Mehmed Said Pasha (1830–1914), Ottoman grand vizier
 Yirmisekizzade Mehmed Said Pasha (died 1761), Ottoman grand vizier
 Mohammad Said bin Yusof, Malaysian politician
 Mohammed Said Bareh, Eritrean politician
 Muhammad Ali, Prince of Said, Egyptian prince
 Muhammad Osman Said, former Prime Minister of Libya
 Muhammad Said al-Attar, a former acting Prime Minister of Yemen
 Muhammad Sa'id Pasha, fourth ruler of Egypt from the Muhammad Ali dynasty
 Muhammad Said Pasha, former Prime Minister of Iraq

Others
 Mohamed Said (actor), Swedish actor in the Swedish TV drama series Andra avenyn
 Mohammad Saeed (cricketer, born 1910), Pakistani cricketer
 Mohammad Saeed (cricketer, born 1983), Pakistani cricketer
 Muhammad Said (GIA), a leader of the Armed Islamic Group of Algeria
 Muhammed Said Abdulla, Tanzanian author
 Mohamed Said (athlete), Egyptian 1992 Paralympian
 Muhammad Sa'id al-Amudi, Saudi Arabian journalist, literary critic and official.